Sanjay Mittal is a Professor of computational fluid dynamics in the Department of Aerospace Engineering at Indian Institute of Technology Kanpur, India.

Early life and education 
After doing his B.Tech. from IIT Kanpur in 1988, he got enrolled at University of Minnesota, Twin Cities for M.S. program. He then received his Ph.D. and worked as a research associate under Tayfun Tezduyar.

Career 
After working for two years at Army High Performance Computing center he returned to India and joined IIT Kanpur in the year of 1994 as an assistant professor.

Awards 
Mittal has been the recipient of various awards.

 2006 Shanti Swarup Bhatnagar Prize for Science and Technology
 2015 G. D. Birla Award for Scientific Research

References

Indian aerospace engineers
IIT Kanpur alumni
Computational fluid dynamicists
Academic staff of IIT Kanpur
IIT Kanpur
Living people
University of Minnesota alumni
Indian fluid dynamicists
Year of birth missing (living people)
Recipients of the Shanti Swarup Bhatnagar Award in Engineering Science